The Old Road Subdivision is a railroad line owned & operated by R.J. Corman Railroad Group in the U.S. state of Kentucky. The line was formerly owned by CSX Transportation. At its west end the line branches off of the LCL Subdivision and at its east end the line connects to the CC Subdivision.

See also
 List of CSX Transportation lines

References

CSX Transportation lines
Transportation in Jefferson County, Kentucky
Transportation in Shelby County, Kentucky
Transportation in Franklin County, Kentucky
Transportation in Woodford County, Kentucky
Transportation in Scott County, Kentucky
Transportation in Lexington, Kentucky
Transportation in Clark County, Kentucky